The Indian National Badminton Championships is a tournament organized to crown the best badminton players in India since 1934. Until the 1960s, foreign players could compete in the championships, which is why the winners' lists includes Malaysians and Danes (e.g. Erland Kops).

The championships are locally now referred to as the All Indian National Badminton Championships. The National titles in India are the following:
 Men's Singles: Vikas Topiwala Challenge Cup
 Women's Singles: Olympian Badminton Challenge Cup
 Men's Doubles: Calcutta Badminton Cup
 Women's Doubles: All India Badminton Association Cup
 Mixed Doubles: Burdwan Challenge Cup
 Men's Team: Ibrahim Rahimtoola Cup
 Women's Team: Gulab Rai Chadha Cup

List of Winners

See also
 Badminton in India
 Badminton Association of India
 India national badminton team

References

External links
 Badminton Association of India: National Winners

National badminton championships
Recurring sporting events established in 1934
1934 establishments in India